Štěrba (Czech feminine: Štěrbová) or Sterba may refer to:

 Helena Štěrbová (born 1988), Czech handball player
 Jan Štěrba (born 1981), Czech sprint canoeist
 Lenka Štěrbová (born 1994), Czech swimmer
 Marta Štěrbová, Czech orienteering competitor
 Tatana Sterba (born 1976), dance and trance producer better known under her alias DJ Tatana

See also
 
 
 Sterba's corydoras